This is a recap of the 1968 season for the Professional Bowlers Association (PBA) Tour.  It was the tour's tenth season, and consisted of 34 events. Jim Stefanich won five titles on the season and was the Tour's leading money winner,  earning him Sporting News PBA Player of the Year honors.  Wayne Zahn won the PBA National Championship, while Dave Davis captured the title at the Firestone Tournament of Champions.

Tournament schedule

References

External links
1968 Season Schedule

Professional Bowlers Association seasons
1968 in bowling